The men's road race of the 2022 UCI Road World Championships was a cycling event that took
place on 25 September 2022 in Wollongong, Australia.

Qualification
Qualification was based mainly on the UCI World Ranking by nations as of 16 August 2022.

UCI World Rankings
The following nations qualified.

Continental champions

Participating nations
169 cyclists from 50 nations competed in the event. The number of cyclists per nation is shown in parentheses.

Final classification

References

Men's road race
2022
2022 in men's road cycling